Communauté d'agglomération Sarreguemines Confluences is the communauté d'agglomération, an intercommunal structure, centred on the town of Sarreguemines. It is located in the Moselle and Bas-Rhin departments, in the Grand Est region, northeastern France. Created in 2017, its seat is in Sarreguemines. Its area is 340.5 km2. Its population was 64,271 in 2019, of which 20,635 in Sarreguemines proper.

Composition
The communauté d'agglomération consists of the following 38 communes, of which 1 (Siltzheim) in Bas-Rhin:

Bliesbruck
Blies-Ébersing
Blies-Guersviller
Ernestviller
Frauenberg
Grosbliederstroff
Grundviller
Guebenhouse
Hambach
Hazembourg
Hilsprich
Holving
Hundling
Ippling
Kalhausen
Kappelkinger
Kirviller
Lixing-lès-Rouhling
Loupershouse
Nelling
Neufgrange
Puttelange-aux-Lacs
Rémelfing
Rémering-lès-Puttelange
Richeling
Rouhling
Saint-Jean-Rohrbach
Sarralbe
Sarreguemines
Sarreinsming
Siltzheim
Le Val-de-Guéblange
Wiesviller
Willerwald
Wittring
Wœlfling-lès-Sarreguemines
Woustviller
Zetting

References

Sarreguemines Confluences
Sarreguemines Confluences
Sarreguemines Confluences